Toto in Paris (also known as  	Totò innamorato) is a 1958 Italian-French comedy film directed by Camillo Mastrocinque.

Plot 
The Marquis Gastone De Chemandel plans to kill his lookalike Toto, a poor Neapolitan vagabond who is a perfect double of the Marquis, to  collect his life-insurance premium.

Cast 

 Totò: Marquis Gastone De Chemandel / Toto 
 Sylva Koscina: Juliette Marchand 
 Fernand Gravey: Dr. Duclos 
 Lauretta Masiero: The Gypsy
 Philippe Clay: The Maître
 Paul Guers: Pierre  
 Tiberio Mitri: The Bodyguard
 Luigi Pavese: Professor Calogero Tempesta 
 Fanfulla: Effeminato del treno 
 Memmo Carotenuto: Brigadiere
 Olimpia Cavalli: Donna nel vagone letto accanto

References

External links

1958 films
1958 comedy films
Films directed by Camillo Mastrocinque
Films with screenplays by René Barjavel
Italian comedy films
French comedy films
Films set in Paris
1950s French films
1950s Italian films